Wong Ka Man is a Hongkonger former footballer who played as a forward. She has been a member of the Hong Kong women's national team.

International career 
Wong Ka Man capped for Hong Kong at senior level during two AFC Women's Asian Cup qualifications (2010 and 2014) and the 2012 AFC Women's Olympic Qualifying Tournament.

See also 
 List of Hong Kong women's international footballers

References

External links 
 

Living people
Hong Kong women's footballers
Women's association football forwards
Hong Kong women's international footballers
Year of birth missing (living people)